Crossroads College (originally International Christian Bible College and later Minnesota Bible College) was a four-year, coeducational Christian college in Rochester, Minnesota, United States. It was founded in 1913 and ceased offering classes in the fall of 2016.  Crossroads formed a partnership with Hope International University in 2018 .  In the Fall of 2020 Crossroads College rebranded to become Crossroads Church Partners and continues to develop Christian Leaders and provide resources to strengthen churches. 

Crossroads was nondenominational, drawing students from a variety of Christian denominations, especially Christian churches and churches of Christ.

History
Its roots are in the International Christian Bible College (1913) founded by David E. Olson in Minneapolis, which later was renamed Minneapolis Bible College (1924), then Minnesota Bible University (1932), and Minnesota Bible College (1942). In 1971 it moved to its current location in Rochester. In 2002 it was renamed Crossroads College.

Crossroads' original building is still a landmark in Minneapolis, standing at the corner of University Avenue and 15th Street, across from the main gates of the University of Minnesota.  Affectionately named, "The Dinky Dome" because of the proximity of the building to Dinkytown in SE Minneapolis, the dome was recently sold to developers who will remodel the original building and add an apartment and shopping complex to the north of the building.  The site is distinctive by its large pillars that face University Avenue, but also the large dome that sits above the building's three stories - this dome has served as a landmark for the area since 1913.

Accessed via Mayowood Road and 16th Street SW near Apache Mall, this campus offered one of the best vistas of Southwest Rochester. On campus was an academic building overlooking a small lake, library and student center, music studio, and multiple townhouses for students. Touch football was played informally on the top of the hill over the campus, and broomball was played in the winter on the pond below the campus. Alumnus Daniel Christensen had brooms purchased, learned the rulebook, and set up teams for an enjoyable intramural sport in the winter months. The college also played volleyball in Rochester, with the best team composed of alumni of MBC and coached by Mark Comeaux.

In August 2016, the college announced it would not open for the scheduled fall semester, citing low enrollment.

Sports, clubs, and traditions
Crossroads College fielded teams in men's and women's basketball. The school belonged to both the National Christian College Athletic Association (NCCAA) and the Association of Christian College Athletics (ACCA).

Student groups included:
 The Ambassadors, a mission group
 Chorale
 International Students Fellowship
 Outreach Teams, including Adoration Vocal Ensemble and three worship bands
 Student Council
 Xiphos, the student-led newspaper

Presidents
David E. Olson, 1913-1924
Eugene C. Sanderson, 1924-1932
Floyd Jones, 1932-1936
Paul A. Millard, 1936-1944
Russell E. Boatman, 1945-1961
Lynn D. Dietz 1961-1962
Harry Poll, 1962-1964
Galen Skinner, 1965-1973
Bruce Miller, 1973-1985
Donald R. Lloyd, 1985-1995
Robert W. Cash, 1995-2003
Bill Luce, Jr., 2003-2006
Mike Benson, 2006-2008 (Interim)
Mike Kilgallin, 2008–2016

See also

 List of colleges and universities in Minnesota
 Higher education in Minnesota

References

External links
Crossroads College

1913 establishments in Minnesota
Association for Biblical Higher Education
Buildings and structures in Rochester, Minnesota
Defunct private universities and colleges in Minnesota
Education in Olmsted County, Minnesota
Educational institutions established in 1913
Educational institutions disestablished in 2016
Nondenominational Christian universities and colleges
Universities and colleges affiliated with the Christian churches and churches of Christ